Diving at the 2017 Islamic Solidarity Games was held in Aquatic Palace, Baku, Azerbaijan from 18 to 21 May 2017.

Medalists

Men

Women

Medal table

References

External links 
Official website

2017 Islamic Solidarity Games
2017 in diving
2017
Diving in Azerbaijan